Ferenc Kovács (born November 1, 1953) is a Hungarian politician, member of the National Assembly (MP) for Sárvár (Vas County Constituency IV) from 1998 to 2014. He is the current President of the General Assembly of Vas County from 2006.

He joined Fidesz in 1992. Kovács was a member of the Committee on Sport and Tourism since 2006. He was one of the key people of the Castle Rescue Program and Chairman of the Subcommittee on Castles, Mansions and Fortresses. In September 2013, he was dismissed as chairman of the Fidesz's Sárvár branch by the party's central leadership. According to press reports, the relationship between Kovács and fellow Fidesz member from Vas County, and also Minister of Defence, Csaba Hende, was tense and conflictual in the previous years.

Personal life
He is married and has three children.

References

1953 births
Living people
Fidesz politicians
Members of the National Assembly of Hungary (1998–2002)
Members of the National Assembly of Hungary (2002–2006)
Members of the National Assembly of Hungary (2006–2010)
Members of the National Assembly of Hungary (2010–2014)
Politicians from Budapest